The 1965 NBA playoffs was the postseason tournament of the National Basketball Association's 1964–65 season. The tournament concluded with the Eastern Division champion Boston Celtics defeating the Western Division champion Los Angeles Lakers 4 games to 1 in the NBA Finals.

Boston won its seventh consecutive NBA title and eighth overall while handing the Lakers their fourth straight Finals loss in the process.

This was the first playoff appearance for the Baltimore Bullets, who had begun play in the 1961–62 season as the Chicago Packers.

Bracket

Division Semifinals

Eastern Division Semifinals

(2) Cincinnati Royals vs. (3) Philadelphia 76ers

This was the third playoff meeting between these two teams, with the Royals winning the first two meetings.

Western Division Semifinals

(2) St. Louis Hawks vs. (3) Baltimore Bullets

 Bob Pettit's last NBA game.

This was the first playoff meeting between these two teams.

Division Finals

Eastern Division Finals

(1) Boston Celtics vs. (3) Philadelphia 76ers

 John Havlicek steals the inbounds pass by Hal Greer.

This was the ninth playoff meeting between these two teams, with both teams splitting the first eight meetings when the 76ers were the Syracuse Nationals.

Western Division Finals

(1) Los Angeles Lakers vs. (3) Baltimore Bullets

This was the first playoff meeting between these two teams.

NBA Finals: (E1) Boston Celtics vs. (W1) Los Angeles Lakers

 Tom Heinsohn's final NBA game.

This was the fourth playoff meeting between these two teams, with the Celtics winning the first three meetings.

See also
1965 NBA Finals
1964–65 NBA season

References

External links
Basketball-Reference.com's 1965 NBA Playoffs page

National Basketball Association playoffs
Playoffs

fi:NBA-kausi 1964–1965#Pudotuspelit